The Pulicat class of patrol boats were a series of five water craft of Russian origin (ex-Poluchat class), which were in service of Indian Navy and were later-on transferred to newly formed Indian Coast Guard in 1977. They were ordered in 1965 and delivered in 1967. INS Panvel took part in the Indo-Pakistani War of 1971. The boats in the series were named after coastal cities of India.

Boats in the class

See also

References

Patrol boat classes
Patrol vessels of the Indian Navy